Tselinny is a rural locality (a settlement) and the administrative centre of Tselinnoye Rural Settlement, Yeravninsky District, Republic of Buryatia, Russia. The population was 417 as of 2017. There are 11 streets.

Geography 
Tselinny is located 232 km east of Sosnovo-Ozerskoye (the district's administrative centre) by road. Telemba is the nearest rural locality. The Konda River flows near the village.

References 

Rural localities in Yeravninsky District